The 2018–19 UC Irvine Anteaters men's basketball team represented the University of California, Irvine in the 2018–19 NCAA Division I men's basketball season. The Anteaters were led by ninth-year head coach Russell Turner competing in the Bren Events Center. UC Irvine is a member of the Big West Conference, and participated in their 41st consecutive season in that league. The team finished the season with many new records that included a new school record of 31-6, longest game winning streak (17), and first ever NCAA Tournament win over Kansas State in the South Region 1st Round before falling to Oregon in the 2nd Round. Jonathan Galloway became the new program record holder of rebounds (969), career games won (95), career games played (146). Max Hazzard broke the Bren Events Center record for most three pointers made in a game on December 15 against Denver (10) and the team broke the school record for most threes made in a game that night with 18. Evan Leonard set a school record of 44 consecutive free throws made that ended in the NCAA Tournament 2nd Round vs Oregon. The team finished 2nd in the 2018 Asia-Pacific University Basketball Challenge prior to the season and the 2019 Gulf Coast Showcase during the regular season. The team won its 4th regular season title in 6 seasons on March 2, 2019 in a win over UC Riverside. The team won its second Big West tournament title with wins over UC Riverside, Long Beach State, and Cal State Fullerton.

Previous season

The Anteaters finished the season 18–17 overall, and 11–5 in the conference. During the season, the Anteaters participated in the Las Vegas Invitational, which was held in Manhattan, Kansas, Tempe, Arizona, and Paradise, Nevada. UC Irvine finished 7th place by defeating Northern Arizona and losing to Rider. Prior to the tournament, UC Irvine lost at Kansas State and at Arizona State. UC Irvine also defeated Idaho in the Vandal Holiday Hoops Classic in Boise, Idaho. In the postseason, UC Irvine defeated Hawaii and UC Santa Barbara but lost to Cal State Fullerton in the championship of the 2018 Big West Conference men's basketball tournament in Anaheim, California.

The Anteaters competed from August 5 through August 12 in the 2018 Asia-Pacific University Basketball Challenge, hosted by the KBA and Yonsei University. This is the 5th edition of the tournament and UC Irvine is the 1st NCAA Division I school invited. Gonzaga were the original invitees but could not make the tournament and they along with the KBA offered the spot to UC Irvine. In the competition, UC Irvine faced hosts Yonsei University, De La Salle University from the Philippines, the Japanese national university team, the Chinese Taipei national university selection team, and the Russian national university team in a round-robin format. The competition was played under FIBA rules, which differ from NCAA rules. UC Irvine was defeated in the final game of the round robin tournament to Russia 92–91. Both teams had a 4–1 record, but Russia took the Gold Medal by winning the head-to-head match up.

Incoming freshman Aiden Krause did not partake in this tournament as he represented the Australia U-18 team in the 2018 FIBA Asia U-18 Championship in the same period. Australia won the competition and qualified for the 2019 FIBA Under-19 Basketball World Cup.

Roster

Schedule

|-
!colspan=12 style=""| 2018 Asia-Pacific University Basketball Challenge

|-
!colspan=12 style=""| Exhibition

|-
!colspan=12 style=""| Non-conference regular season

|-
!colspan=12 style=""| Big West regular season

|-
!colspan=12 style=""| Big West tournament

|-
!colspan=12 style=""| NCAA tournament

References

UC Irvine
UC Irvine Anteaters men's basketball seasons
UC Irvine
UC Irvine
UC Irvine